Xisanhuan is a metro station of Zhengzhou Metro Line 1.

The station is named after the West 3rd Ring Road (Xisanhuan in pinyin). The naming of the station is considered to be confusing and thus criticized by some people on local forums.

Station layout 
The station has 2 floors underground. The B1 floor is for the station concourse and the B2 floor is for the platforms and tracks. The station has one island platform and two tracks for Line 1.

Exits

Surroundings
Xiliuhu Park

References

Stations of Zhengzhou Metro
Line 1, Zhengzhou Metro
Railway stations in China opened in 2013